The Oarba is a right tributary of the river Horincea in Romania. It flows into the Horincea in Rogojeni.

References

Rivers of Romania
Rivers of Galați County